Her Benny is a 1920 British silent romance film directed by A. V. Bramble and starring Sydney Wood, Babs Reynolds and Charles Buckmaster. It is adapted from the popular Victorian novel Her Benny (1879) by Silas K. Hocking. It follows a young boy from Liverpool as he grows up in a harsh environment.

Cast
 Sydney Wood ...  Benny, as a child 
 Babs Reynolds ...  Nellie Bates 
 Charles Buckmaster ...  Benny Bates 
 Peggy Patterson ...  Eva Lawrence 
 C. Hargrave Mansell ...  Joe Wragg 
 Lottie Blackford ...  Mrs. Wragg 
 Robert Vallis ...  Dick Bates

References

External links

1920 films
British romance films
Films directed by A. V. Bramble
Films based on British novels
British black-and-white films
British silent feature films
1920s romance films
1920s English-language films
1920s British films